Rucava white butter is a traditional cow's milk butter produced in Rucava, Latvia, since the early 20th century. The butter has Protected Designation of Origin classification in the European Union, which it received in 2018.

References

Butter
Latvian products with protected designation of origin